Henry A. Chase was a member of the Wisconsin State Assembly.

Biography
Chase was born on March 18, 1841, in Royalton, Vermont. He graduated from Rush Medical College.

Assembly career
Chase was elected to the Assembly in 1870 and 1871. He was a Republican.

References

People from Royalton, Vermont
Republican Party members of the Wisconsin State Assembly
Physicians from Wisconsin
Rush Medical College alumni
1841 births
Year of death missing